Volodymyr Borysovych Groysman, sometimes transliterated as Volodymyr Borysovych Hroisman (born 20 January 1978), is a Ukrainian politician who was the Prime Minister of Ukraine from 14 April 2016 to 29 August 2019.

From March 2006 until February 2014 Groysman was the Mayor of Vinnytsia. From then to November 2014, he held two concurrent positions as the Vice Prime Minister of Ukraine for Regional Policy and the Minister of Regional Development, Construction and Housing and Communal Services of Ukraine. He was elected into parliament on the party lists of the pro-presidential Petro Poroshenko Bloc. Groysman's next post was the Chairman of the Verkhovna Rada (Ukraine's national parliament), starting late November 2014 until being appointed Prime Minister. In the 2019 Ukrainian parliamentary election he took part as the party leader of the party Ukrainian Strategy. But this party failed to win any parliamentary seats. Groysman's tenure as Prime Minister ended when Oleksiy Honcharuk was appointed Prime Minister of Ukraine on 29 August 2019.

In many media sources Groysman is called the first Jewish Prime Minister of Ukraine, although in fact it was Yukhym Zvyahilsky.

Early life

Volodymyr Borysovych Groysman was born in Vinnytsia, to Jewish parents. His father, Borys Groysman, is a businessman and a local politician. In 1994, he started his career as a commercial director of his father's small private business company "ОКО" and as a commercial director of the private enterprise "Youth". Groysman studied at Ukraine's Interregional Academy of Personnel Management (known as MAUP).

Career
In the 2002 local elections, he was elected as a member of the Vinnytsia City Council from the 29th electoral district. In the city council, he worked as the Deputy Head of the Permanent Committee of the City Council on Human Rights, Lawfulness, Council Members' Activities and Ethics. In 2003, he graduated from the Interregional Academy of Personnel Management with a specialty in Jurisprudence. In 2004 Groysman joined the party Our Ukraine.

On 25 November 2005, he was elected the head of the city council and the acting mayor. In the 26 March 2006 local elections, he was elected as the city's mayor, becoming the youngest ever mayor of a Ukrainian administrative center ( age 28 years at time of elections ). In the 10 October 2010 local elections, he was re-elected mayor for a second term, as a candidate of the party Conscience of Ukraine, gaining the support of 77.81% of citizens. While mayor, Groysman was the vice-president of the Association of Ukrainian Cities.

In February 2010, Groysman graduated from the National Academy of State Administration with a specialty in Community Development Management, especially management on the local and regional levels.

Government minister
On 27 February 2014, Groysman was concurrently appointed as the Vice Prime Minister for Regional Policy and the Minister of Regional Development, Construction and Housing and Communal Services of Ukraine in the First Yatsenyuk Government. During this period, Groysman was appointed the chair of the Ukrainian Special Government Commission on MH17, investigating the shootdown and crash of Malaysia Airlines Flight 17 ("MH17"), during the War in Donbass.

The parliamentary coalition that supported this government collapsed on 24 July 2014, and on the same day, Prime Minister Arseniy Yatsenyuk announced that he was immediately resigning from his office. However, Yatsenyuk's resignation was not accepted by parliament. Nevertheless, on 25 July 2014, the Yatsenyuk Government appointed Groysman as its acting Prime Minister. However, on 31 July 2014, the Verkhovna Rada declined Yatsenyuk's resignation because only 16 of the 450 MPs voted for his resignation.

Chairman of the Verkhovna Rada
In the 2014 parliamentary election, Groysman was elected into parliament after being in the top 10 of the Petro Poroshenko Bloc's electoral list.

On 27 November 2014, at the first session of newly elected parliament, Groysman was elected as the Chairman of the Verkhovna Rada. 359 (of the 423 deputies) supported his nomination. He was also the only candidate for the post.

Prime Minister of Ukraine

With public dissatisfaction and allegations of corruption surrounding his government, Prime Minister Arseniy Yatsenyuk announced on 10 April 2016 that he planned to resign. Following several days of parliamentary debate, on 14 April 2016, Groysman was voted in by MPs 257 to 50 as the 16th Prime Minister of Ukraine. Groysman is the youngest Ukrainian prime minister ever (age 38 at election) and the only one ever to be of Jewish ethnicity and/or religion.

Groysman's selection as PM triggered a constitutional requirement for a new Cabinet, in which new appointments were already forthcoming due to resignations in protest over Ukraine's corruption and reform issues.  Some of the posts in the new Groysman government were assigned to people who were perceived as Poroshenko allies.

Groysman indicated in 2016 he would fight corruption and build closer ties with the European Union, which has complained about widespread and pervasive corruption in Ukraine's government and economy.

Groysman left the Petro Poroshenko Bloc "Solidarity" on 23 April 2019. On 20 May 2019, Volodymyr Zelensky, who defeated the incumbent Poroshenko in the 2019 Ukrainian presidential election, was inaugurated as President of Ukraine and Groysman announced he would resign as Prime Minister of Ukraine.

2019 parliamentary election and end of prime ministership
On 24 May 2019, Groysman announced that he would take part in the 2019 Ukrainian parliamentary election with the party Ukrainian Strategy. (This party was registered in 2015 as the local party Vinnytsia European Strategy.) On 30 May 2019, the Ukrainian parliament voted to reject Groysman's resignation as Prime Minister of Ukraine and confirmed that he would remain Prime Minister until at least the parliamentary election which was held in July 2019. In this election Ukrainian Strategy failed to win any parliamentary seats gaining 2.41% of the total votes while the election had a 5% election threshold. The party also failed to win a constituency seat.

Groysman's prime ministership ended when Oleksiy Honcharuk was appointed Prime Minister of Ukraine on 29 August 2019.

Personal life
Groysman is married and has two daughters and a son.

Income 
For 2019, Groysman declared a salary of UAH 425,503, a 2017 Mercedes-Benz GLE-Class 350D car, and an entire set of luxury wristwatches (Ulysse Nardin, Audemars Piguet, Rolex, Parmigiani, Girard-Perregaux, Breguet, Boucheron).

Awards
 2012:  Order of Merit of 2nd degree, for contributions in the development of Ukraine and high professionalism
 2011:  Knight's Cross of the Order of Merit of the Republic of Poland, for merit in the development of Polish-Ukrainian cooperation
 2008:  Order of Merit of 3rd degree

See also
 List of mayors of Vinnytsia

References

External links

 
 Official website of Ukrainian Strategy

|-

|-

|-

|-

1978 births
Chairmen of the Verkhovna Rada
Interregional Academy of Personnel Management alumni
Jewish prime ministers
Jewish Ukrainian politicians
Knights of the Order of Merit of the Republic of Poland
Living people
Mayors of places in Ukraine
Eighth convocation members of the Verkhovna Rada
Ministers of Regional Development, Construction and Communal Living of Ukraine
National Academy of State Administration alumni
Our Ukraine (political party) politicians
Politicians from Vinnytsia
People of the Euromaidan
Petro Poroshenko Bloc politicians
Prime Ministers of Ukraine
Ukrainian Jews
Vice Prime Ministers of Ukraine